The Botanical Garden of Naples, Italy (in Italian: Orto botanico di Napoli, also Real Orto Botanico) is a research facility of the University of Naples Federico II.

The premises take up about 15 hectares and are located in via Foria, adjacent to the historical edifice Albergo dei Poveri, the Royal Hospice for the Poor under the Bourbon dynasty. The facility is part of the university's Department of Natural Science. It is one of Naples's many scientific and educational facilities established under French rule (1806–15). The garden opened in 1810.

Currently, the garden features around 25,000 samples of flora, representing approximately 10,000 plant species. Although accessible to the public, the garden is not strictly a public park. It is a distinct educational centre for the university and local high schools from the University of Naples's agriculture department. Additionally, the garden is involved in the protection of endangered plant species. There is also a section of the garden devoted to ethnobotany, where medicinally valuable plants for humans are examined. In addition to lesser structures, there are two larger ones on the property: the recently renovated "castle" from the 17th century and the 5,000 square metre Merola Greenhouse. The museum of Paleobotany and Ethnobotany is located in the lecture and display halls of the castle.

See also
 List of botanical gardens in Italy

External links
 The Botanical Garden of Naples (official website)

Botanical gardens in Italy
Parks in Naples
1810 establishments in Italy
Gardens in Campania
University of Naples Federico II